Parde Ke Peechey is a 1971 Bollywood drama film. The film stars Vinod Mehra.Yogeeta Bali and Bindu.

Cast 
Yogeeta Bali as Tara
Bindu as Suchitra
Jagdeep as Gautam
Padma Khanna
Vinod Mehra as Rajan
 Tarun Bose
Pran as  Balwant

Music 
The music was composed by Shankar Jaikishan.
"Tere Bina Jiya Na Lage, Aja Re Aja" – Lata Mangeshkar
"Adi Adi Ruk Ja Kudi, Arey Surat Se KayaPehchanoge" – Kishore Kumar
"Dil Deewane Dil Deewane Tune Socha Bhi Hai Ki Kaun Hai Tera" – Lata Mangeshkar
"Tum Jab Jab Samne Aate Ho" – Kishore Kumar, Asha Bhosle
"Jab Husn Ka Jaadu Sir Pe Chad Ke Bolta Hai" – Asha Bhosle
"Teen Kanwariya Teen Kanwariya Hathon Me Mehndi Racha De Koi" – Shamshad Begum, Usha Mangeshkar, Asha Bhosle

References

External links 
 

1971 films
Films scored by Shankar–Jaikishan
1970s Hindi-language films
1971 drama films
Films directed by K. Shankar